Katerina Giakoumidou (born 21 June 1977) is a Greek sailor. She competed in the Yngling event at the 2004 Summer Olympics.

References

External links
 

1977 births
Living people
Greek female sailors (sport)
Olympic sailors of Greece
Sailors at the 2004 Summer Olympics – Yngling
Sailors (sport) from Athens